The Suffisant was a 74-gun Pégase-class ship of the line of the French Navy, launched in 1782. She served during the last months of the American War of Independence, and survived to see action in the French Revolutionary Wars.

Construction and early service
Suffisant was laid down at Toulon Dockyard in July 1781 to a design by Antoine Groignard. Launched on 6 March 1782, she had entered service by August of that year.

Capture
She was handed over by French Royalists at Toulon to the Anglo-Spanish occupying forces during the occupation of Toulon in August 1793, but was burnt at the subsequent evacuation of that port in December to avoid her being taken back into French service.

Notes

a.  The six ships of the Pégase-class proved unlucky in their encounters with the Royal Navy. Pégase, the nameship of the class, was captured by the British in 1782, less than a year after being launched, and served in the Royal Navy until 1815. The other five - Liberté, Suffisant, Puissant, Alcide and Censeur - were all taken by Royalist forces during the occupation of Toulon in 1793, with Liberté and Suffisant being burnt in the withdrawal, Puissant taken away and added to the Royal Navy, and Alcide and Censeur left to fall back into Republican hands. Alcide blew up while fighting a British fleet at the Naval Battle of Hyères Islands in July 1795.

Citations

References

Winfield, Rif and Roberts, Stephen (2015) French Warships in the Age of Sail 1786-1861: Design, Construction, Careers and Fates. Seaforth Publishing. .

Ships of the line of the French Navy
1782 ships
Ships built in France
Pégase-class ships of the line
Maritime incidents in 1793